Friederike Gubernatis  (born 1 April 1988) is a German handball player for Buxtehuder SV.

She was selected as part of the German team for the 2017 World Women's Handball Championship.

References

External links

1988 births
Living people
Sportspeople from Hamburg
German female handball players